Actinoptychus is a genus of diatoms belonging to the family Heliopeltaceae.

The genus was described in 1843 by Christian Gottfried Ehrenberg.

Species:
 Actinoptychus octodenarius Ehrenberg
 Actinoptychus senarius (Ehrenberg) Ehrenberg, 1843

References

Diatoms
Diatom genera